A penumbral lunar eclipse will take place on May 7, 2031.

Visibility

Related lunar eclipses

Lunar year series

Saros series

Metonic series

Half-Saros cycle
A lunar eclipse will be preceded and followed by solar eclipses by 9 years and 5.5 days (a half saros). This lunar eclipse is related to two partial solar eclipses of Solar Saros 119.

Tritos series 
 Preceded: Lunar eclipse of June 5, 2020
 Followed: Lunar eclipse of April 5, 2042

Tzolkinex 
 Preceded: Lunar eclipse of March 25, 2024
 Followed: Lunar eclipse of June 17, 2038

See also 
List of lunar eclipses and List of 21st-century lunar eclipses

Notes

External links 
 

2031-05
2031-05
2031 in science